Yarmouth Port is a census-designated place (CDP) in the town of Yarmouth  in Barnstable County, Massachusetts, United States. The population was 5,320 at the 2010 census.

Yarmouth Port was home to the original Christmas Tree Shops until its closing in 2007. The town is home to the international headquarters of IFAW.

Geography
Yarmouth Port is located in the northern part of the town of Yarmouth at  (41.704633, −70.220923). It is bordered to the north by Cape Cod Bay, to the east by the town of Dennis, and to the west by the town of Barnstable. U.S. Route 6, the Mid-Cape Highway, is to the south, beyond which are the CDPs of South Yarmouth and West Yarmouth.

Demographics

At the 2000 census there were 5,395 people, 2,546 households, and 1,642 families in the CDP. The population density was 344.9/km (892.7/mi). There were 3,104 housing units at an average density of 198.4/km (513.6/mi).  The racial makeup of the CDP was 98.46% White, 0.26% African American, 0.17% Native American, 0.32% Asian, 0.02% Pacific Islander, 0.19% from other races, and 0.59% from two or more races. Hispanic or Latino people of any race were 0.70%.

Of the 2,546 households 17.0% had children under the age of 18 living with them, 56.2% were married couples living together, 6.8% had a female householder with no husband present, and 35.5% were non-families. 30.8% of households were one person and 19.8% were one person aged 65 or older. The average household size was 2.11 and the average family size was 2.61.

The age distribution was 15.8% under the age of 18, 3.0% from 18 to 24, 18.7% from 25 to 44, 27.9% from 45 to 64, and 34.7% 65 or older. The median age was 53 years. For every 100 females, there were 85.9 males. For every 100 females age 18 and over, there were 80.7 males.

The median household income was $47,576 and the median family income  was $57,841. Males had a median income of $41,029 versus $30,171 for females. The per capita income for the CDP was $30,418. About 2.2% of families and 4.3% of the population were below the poverty line, including 6.2% of those under age 18 and 1.3% of those age 65 or over.

Notable residents 

 Edward Gorey (1925–2000), artist and writer

References

Census-designated places in Barnstable County, Massachusetts
Census-designated places in Massachusetts
Populated coastal places in Massachusetts
Yarmouth, Massachusetts